Colonial Heights is a neighborhood located in the South-East corner of Lawrence, Massachusetts.

Lawrence, Massachusetts
Neighborhoods in Massachusetts
Populated places in Essex County, Massachusetts